DYNF (91.3 FM), broadcasting as 91.3 Radyo Kauswagan, is a radio station owned and operated by the National Nutrition Council under the Nutriskwela Community Radio network. The station's studio is located at the 2nd floor, ICTC Building, ESSU Borongan Campus, Brgy. Maypangdan, Borongan. "Kauswagan" stands for Improvement in Visayan.

References

Radio stations established in 2013
Radio stations in Eastern Samar